Buse Arıkazan (born 8 July 1994) is a Turkish pole vaulter. She is a member of Enka SK in Istanbul. She holds national records both outdoor and indoor. She studied Exercise and Sport Science at Hacettepe University in Ankara.

Early life
Buse Arıkan was born in Altındağ district of Ankara Province, Turkey. She started running sport in the elementary school upon recommendation of her teacher. She drew attention with her success in intraschool competitions. She later unwillingly switched over to pole vault upon the recommendation of the national athletics coach Tayfun Aygün.

Sports career
Arıkazan was the national record holder for juniors with 3.75 m before it was broken by Demet Parlak in 2013. She captured the gold medal at the 2013 Islamic Solidarity Games held in Palembang, Indonesia. She took the bronze medal at the 2015 Balkan Indoor Championships in Istanbul. During the 2017 Istanbul Cup, she broke the national record first with 4.27 m and then with 4.32 m, which was held by Demet Parlakwith 4.26 m. Arıkazan shared the gold medal with Demet Parlak at the 2017 Islamic Solidarity Games held in Baku, Azerbaijan. She set the Games record with 4.15 m. She took part at the 2019 Summer Universiade in Naples, Italy. She reached 4.30 m and  placed sixth rank. 2018 Balkan Athletics Championships held in Stara Zagora, Bulgaria, she added one gold medal to her previous two silver and one bronze medals won at the Balkan Athletics Championships. She became bronze medalist at the 2018 Balkan Athletics Indoor Championships in Istanbul. At the Cezmi Or Memorial Tournament in 2018, she equaled the national record held by Demet Parlak with 4.30. She won the silver medal at the 2019 Balkan Indoor Championships in Istanbul. During the Istanbul Olympic Indoor Athletics Qualifications in 2019, she set a new national indoor record with 4.36 m, which belonged to Demet Parlak with 4.33 m. Arıkazan became champion at the 2019 Balkan Championships in Pravets, Bulgaria. She improved her own national record to 4.40 m at the first round of the 2019 Türkcell Athletics Super League in Bursa. She became silver medalist at the 2020 Balkan Athletics Indoor Championships in Istanbul, Turkey.

International competitions

References

External links

Buse Arıkazan at TAF

1994 births
Living people
People from Altındağ, Ankara
Sportspeople from Ankara
Hacettepe University alumni
Turkish female pole vaulters
Enkaspor athletes
Islamic Solidarity Games competitors for Turkey
20th-century Turkish sportswomen
21st-century Turkish sportswomen
Islamic Solidarity Games medalists in athletics